Pasi Sahlberg (born October 26, 1959, in Oulu ) is a Finnish education expert, author and professor at the University of New South Wales in Australia. Previously, Sahlberg has worked as a professor of practice at Harvard University  at the World Bank, and as the director of the Centre for International Mobility (CIMO) in Finland. His work Finnish Lessons: What can the world learn from educational change in Finland? won the Grawemeyer Award in 2013.

Education
Sahlberg is a graduate of University of Helsinki and the University of Oulu. He received his PhD from the University of Jyväskylä in 1996 with a thesis titled Who would help a teacher – post-modern perspective on change in teaching in light of one school improvement project.

Career
Sahlberg taught mathematics and information technology for eight years in middle school and high school. His research investigates issues in educational reform, school improvement and education policy.

References

1959 births
Living people
Educational reformers
University of Oulu alumni
University of Helsinki alumni
University of Jyväskylä alumni
Academic staff of the University of New South Wales
Harvard University faculty
World Bank people